William Martin Leake (14 January 17776 January 1860) was an English military man, topographer, diplomat, antiquarian, writer, and Fellow of the Royal Society. He served in the British military, spending much of his career in the  
Mediterranean seaports. He developed an interest in geography and culture of the regions visited, and authored a number of works, mainly about Greece.

Life
He was born in London to John Martin Leake and Mary Calvert Leake. After completing his education at the Royal Military Academy, Woolwich, he was commissioned a 2nd Lieutenant in the Royal Regiment of Artillery in 1794. Having spent four years in the West Indies as lieutenant of marine artillery, he was promoted to captain, and was sent in 1799 by the government to Constantinople to train the forces of the Ottoman Empire in the use of artillery. The British Empire had decided to support the Ottoman in its defence against Napoleonic France. A journey through Asia Minor in 1800 to join the British fleet at Cyprus inspired him with an interest in antiquarian topography. In 1801, after travelling across the desert with the Turkish army to Egypt, he was, on the expulsion of the French, employed in surveying the Nile valley as far as the cataracts; but having sailed with the ship engaged to convey the Elgin marbles from Athens to England, he lost all his maps and observations when the vessel foundered off Cerigo in Greece.

Shortly after his arrival in England he was sent out to survey the coast of Albania and the Morea, with the view of assisting the Turks against attacks of the French from Italy, and of this he took advantage to form a valuable collection of coins and inscriptions and to explore ancient sites. In 1807, war having broken out between Turkey and England, he was made prisoner at Salonica; but, obtaining his release the same year, he was sent on a diplomatic mission to Ali Pasha of Ioannina, whose confidence he completely won, and with whom he remained for more than a year as British representative.

In 1810 he was granted a yearly sum of £600 for his services in Turkey. In 1815 he retired from the army, in which he held the rank of colonel, devoting the remainder of his life to topographical and antiquarian studies.  He was admitted a Fellow of the Royal Society on 13 April 1815.

He died in Steyning, Sussex on 6 January 1860. The marbles collected by him in Greece were presented to the British Museum; his bronzes, vases, gems and coins were purchased by the University of Cambridge after his death, and are now in the Fitzwilliam Museum. He was also elected a Fellow of the Royal Geographical Society, received the honorary DCL at Oxford (1816), and was a member of the Berlin Academy of Sciences and correspondent of the Institute of France.

Works
He authored:
Researches in Greece (1814)
The topography of Athens: With some remarks on its antiquities (1821)
Journal of a tour in Asia Minor,: with comparative remarks on the ancient and modern geography of that country (1824)
Travels in the Morea: With a map and plans (1830), and a supplement, Peloponnesiaca (1846)
Travels in Northern Greece (1835)
Numismata Hellenica (1854), followed by a supplement in 1859.

His Topography of Athens, the first attempt at a systematic treatment, long remained an authority.

Notes

Sources

Further reading
 
 the Architect for 7 October 1876
 Ernst Curtius in the Preussische Jahrbücher (September 1876)
 JE Sandys, Hist. of Classical Scholarship, iii. (1908), p. 442.
 J.M. Wagstaff, Colonel Leake in Laconia, in J.M. Sanders (ed), ΦΙΛΟΛΑΚΩΝ. Lakonian studies in honour of Hector Catling. (1992) Athens, 277–83.
 J.M. Wagstaff, Pausanias and the topographers. The case of Colonel Leake, in S.E. Alcock, J.F. Cherry, and J. Elsner (eds), Pausanias. Travel and memory in Roman Greece. (2001a) Oxford, 190–206.
 J.M. Wagstaff, Colonel Leake. Traveller and scholar. in S. Searight and M. Wagstaff (eds), Travellers in the Levant. Voyagers and visionaries. (2001b) Durham, 3–15. 
 CL Witmore, On multiple fields. Between the material world and media: Two cases from the Peloponnesus, Greece, Archaeological Dialogues, (2004) 11(2), 133–164. link
 CL Witmore and TV Buttrey, William Martin Leake: a contemporary of P.O. Brøndsted in Greece and in London, in P.O. Brøndsted (1780–1842) – A Danish Classicist in his European context. Rasmussen, B.B., Jensen, J.S., Lund, J. and Märcher (eds) Historisk-filosofiske Skrifter (2008) 31, 15–34.

External links
Travels in Northern Greece by William Martin Leake, online book. Includes Biography and Bibliography.

1777 births
1860 deaths
Fellows of the Royal Society
English antiquarians
English topographers
Burials at Kensal Green Cemetery
British military personnel of the Napoleonic Wars
Prisoners of war held by the Ottoman Empire
Ali Pasha of Ioannina
British diplomats
Royal Artillery officers
Ottoman Empire–United Kingdom relations
Travelers in Asia Minor